Tamagno may refer to several people with this surname:
 Francesco Tamagno an opera tenor from Italy born in 1850
 Giovanni Tamagno an Italian rugby union and professional rugby league footballer who played in the 1940s and 1950s 
 Chelso Tamagno an American basketball player born in 1912
 Mario Tamagno an Italian architect born in 1877